Arges-e Olya (also Romanized as Ārges-e ‘Olyā; also known as Qal‘eh Rafī‘) is a village in Kamazan-e Sofla Rural District, Zand District, Malayer County, Hamadan Province, Iran. At the 2006 census, its population was 192, in 39 families.

References 

Populated places in Malayer County